Georgeta Pitică (married name Strugaru, 5 July 1930 - 13 October 2018), was a former Romanian international table tennis player.

Table tennis career
She won three World Championship medals; a gold medal in the doubles with Maria Alexandru and a bronze medal at the 1961 World Table Tennis Championships followed by a silver medal in the team event at the 1963 World Table Tennis Championships.

See also
 List of table tennis players
 List of World Table Tennis Championships medalists

References

1930 births
2018 deaths
Romanian female table tennis players
Place of birth missing
Date of birth missing
World Table Tennis Championships medalists
People from Fetești